Polizei beim Deutschen Bundestag, also known as Parlamentspolizei or Bundestagspolizei, is a separate police force for the premises of the Bundestag (the German parliament's lower house) in Berlin. The police force acts on behalf of the President of the Bundestag in their capacity as a law enforcement power for these premises.

History
In April 1950 the Hausinspektion der Verwaltung des Deutschen Bundestags was established to ensure the rule of law on the premises of the Bundestag in Bonn. Ranks differed considerably from that of other German police forces of the time. In 1994 it was renamed to its current name and ranks became similar to other police forces.

Legal basis
According to Article 40, 2 of the German constitution only the President of the Bundestag may exercise police powers within the Bundestag's premises. Therefore a special police service independent from the executive power was necessary. The Bundespolizeibeamtengesetz is applicable for all law enforcement officers of the Parliament Police.

Duties
The police officers are recruited from state or federal police agencies. Their role includes the vetting of visitors to the Bundestag, and removal of intruders. They usually do not wear police uniforms, but have a police logo affixed to their plain clothes.

Unlike any other police officers, officers of the Parliament Police are not empowered to assist Public Prosecutors in investigating crimes; they require explicit permission of the President of the Bundestag for such a role.

See also
Security police

Notes

References
 

Bundestag
1949 establishments in Germany
Federal law enforcement agencies of Germany
Specialist law enforcement agencies of Germany
Parliament police services